Eva Plunkett is the inspector-general of the Canadian Security Intelligence Service (CSIS), having served in that role since December 2003.  Plunkett is in charge of reviewing the spy agency's operational activities.

She has criticised her role in the agency, stating that CSIS' mandate is not clearly defined, and thus is it difficult for her to judge whether or not specific operations fall outside of their domain. She has also criticized what she considers to be unreasonable delays by CSIS to provide her with the necessary information to perform her duties.

Plunkett spent 28 years serving in the Solicitor General's office.

In April 2006, Plunkett explained that she believed that emphasis was needed on "traditional" roles of combatting espionage, such as defending classified secrets, rather than focusing strictly on the War on Terror.

Plunkett is also on the Board of Advisors for Carleton University's Canadian Centre of Intelligence and Security Studies program.

References

External links
A listing of the last five Annual Certificates written by the Inspector General

Canadian Security Intelligence Service agents
Year of birth missing (living people)
Place of birth missing (living people)
Living people